Nimbkar Agricultural Research Institute (NARI) is a non-governmental organisation and non-profit research and development institute in Tambmal, Phaltan, Maharashtra, India. (NARI) undertakes research and development in the fields of agriculture, renewable energy, animal husbandry and sustainable development. Shri B. V. Nimbkar founded the institute in 1968, who remained its president until 1990. Currently, Dr. Anil K. Rajvanshi is the director of the institute whereas Dr. Nandini Nimbkar is the president.

Agriculture
NARI has developed various safflower varieties and hybrids for both high oil content and petals. NARI is one of the research centers included in the All India Coordinated Research Project on Oilseeds for irrigated safflower under the aegis of the Indian Council of Agricultural Research (ICAR, New Delhi). The institute has developed high yield varieties and hybrids of cotton, sunflower, safflower, and sweet sorghum (named Madhura), as well as technology for producing ethanol, jaggery and syrup from sweet sorghum. NARI also carries out agrochemical testing for various companies and research laboratories in India to the standards of the Central Insecticides Board for the purposes of registration of new agro-chemicals.

Renewable energy
Work in this field has been mostly in solar and biomass energy and recently in sustainable and environmentally friendly transport systems, ethanol lighting/cooking and handicapped rickshaw.
NARI has developed an efficient multifuel lantern called Noorie for rural areas.
Complete technology for producing ethanol from sweet sorghum has been developed at the institute. A number of high ethanol yielding varieties have also been produced.
NARI has developed a stove running on 50% (w/w) and more ethanol/water concentration.
The gasification technology for thermal applications has been developed at NARI, including technology for gasification of loose leafy biomass fuels like sugarcane leaves and bagasse, sweet sorghum stalks and bagasse.
Technology to increase survival of tree seedlings in arid regions has been developed. Solar energy is used to collect water from soil, which is then fed to the seedlings.
NARI has developed technology for solar detoxification of distillery waste using photocatalysts.
NARI in late 1990s pioneered the development of electric cycle rickshaws in India.
NARI has developed a lantern cum stove running on ethanol for rural areas.
Recently NARI has extended the ethanol Lanstove concept to that running on kerosene.
A YouTube on NARI's Lnstove is available. 
NARI has recently developed a very low cost water purification system using solar energy.

Animal Husbandry
The research and development has focused mostly on all aspects of sheep and goat production. Improved breeds of sheep have been developed which are more productive than the local breed. Also Boer goats are being used for cross breeding to improve meat production of the local goats.

Facilities
NARI has an A class weather station for its agriculture and renewable energy research where all the weather data including solar radiation has been collected since early 1980s.
The institute has crop varietal evaluation as well as pesticides and growth promoters testing facilities.
The Bajaj Center for Sustainable Development, scheduled to open in March 2010, is intended to allow professionals from different fields to work towards finding solutions for the problems faced, in particular, by rural India.

Awards
 Dr. Nandini Nimbkar the present President was honored in 1997 as one of the 47 most distinguished alumna of University of Florida
 Dr. Anil K. Rajvanshi was awarded the 2001 Jamnalal Bajaj Award for Application of Science and Technology for Rural Areas.
 NARI was given the FICCI Annual Award for Rural Development for 2001-02
 NARI's work on electric and improved cycle rickshaws won the Energy Globe Award in the AIR category in 2004.
 Dr. V. Singh, the safflower breeder of the Institute, was given the HARDF Award by Indian Society of Oilseeds Research in January 2003
 The Institute was given the Vasantrao Naik Award for 2006 for contributions to agriculture
 B. V. Nimbkar was awarded the Padma Shri in 2006.
 NARI was given the 2007 CSIR award for S&T for rural development for its sheep breeding work
 NARI was awarded the Globe Award for its work in ethanol lantern cum stove (2009)
 Dr. Anil K. Rajvanshi the Director of NARI was given the 2014 Distinguished Alumnus Award of University of Florida.
 B. V. Nimbkar was awarded the 2016 Jamnalal Bajaj Award for Application of Science and Technology for Rural areas.
 Dr. Anil K. Rajvanshi was awarded the Padma Shri in 2022

References

External links
NARI website

Agricultural research institutes in India
Agriculture in Maharashtra
Renewable energy organizations
Science and technology in Maharashtra
Animal husbandry in India
Animal husbandry in Maharashtra